The Artenghala Formation, also rendered A’ertenghala, is a geological formation located in the Inner Mongolia Autonomous Region and is dated to the Paleoproterozoic period.

References

Geology of Inner Mongolia
Geologic formations of China